Hoplolythrodes is a genus of moths of the family Noctuidae. The genus was erected by Robert W. Poole in 1995.

Species
Hoplolythrodes arivaca (Barnes, 1907)
Hoplolythrodes prepontendyta (Dyar, 1914)

References

Stiriinae